Nu Shooz is an American R&B group fronted by husband-and-wife team of John Smith and Valerie Day, based in Portland, Oregon, United States. Nu Shooz released four albums in the U.S. during the 1980s. Their third album, Poolside, brought the group's sound to a wider audience.

Career
Nu Shooz formed in 1979 in a lineup that originally featured 12 members. This incarnation of the group released its debut album, Can't Turn It Off, in 1982. Although the album saw limited success, the band continued on, paring its lineup down to seven members over the next several years.

Nu Shooz originally released the single "I Can't Wait" in Portland in April 1985 on Poolside Records. The original session occurred at Cascade Recording in Portland in the fall of 1984 and was also featured on the band's sparsely distributed second album, Tha's Right, in 1985. "I Can't Wait" became popular on Portland radio stations at that time, but Nu Shooz was turned down by every major label. A copy of the song made it to the Netherlands, where it was remixed by Peter Slaghuis. This version is known as the 'Dutch Mix.' The remix came back into the United States as an import on Dutch label Injection Records. This version got the attention of Atlantic Records, which signed the band to a contract in January 1986.

Nu Shooz scored two major hits. "I Can't Wait" climbed to No. 2 on the R&B charts and No. 3 on the Billboard Hot 100 chart in June 1986 and spent 15 weeks in the Top 40, and it also hit No. 1 on the Hot Dance Club Play chart earlier that year. Its follow-up, "Point of No Return," was remixed by Shep Pettibone and also topped the dance chart in September 1986; the song peaked at No. 28 on the Hot 100 and No. 35 on the R&B chart. Both singles were on the album Poolside, which charted on Billboard's 200 chart at No. 27, and sold 500,000 copies in the U.S., garnering gold record RIAA certification on October 2, 1986.

In 1987, Nu Shooz was nominated for a Grammy Award in the Best New Artist category, based on its breakthrough success the previous year. The group lost to Bruce Hornsby & the Range. In 1988, the band released the album Told U So, which had its final chart entries to date: "Should I Say Yes?" hit No. 17 on the R&B chart and No. 41 on the Hot 100, while the track "Are You Lookin' for Somebody Nu" topped out at No. 2 on the dance chart. The album itself peaked on the Billboard 200 to No. 93 and was only an overall success in the urban market. "Time Will Tell" was supposed to be the first single from the third album for Atlantic, which was titled Eat & Run, but the album was never released.

In 2007, Nu Shooz was inducted into the Oregon Music Hall of Fame. Also that year Smith and Day formed a spin-off band called Nu Shooz Orchestra with a sound they called "Jazz-Pop-Cinema." They released one album, Pandora's Box, in 2010 along with music videos for the songs "Spy vs Spy," (directed by Mike Wellins) and "Right Before My Eyes" (animated by Smith and Day’s son Malcolm Smith.) The following year "I Can't Wait" was sampled in the hit song "Buzzin'" by Mann.

In 2012, the band released Kung Pao Kitchen, a return to their '80s roots. A year later they put the live group back together for the first time in 20 years and joined the '80s era tour Super Freestyle Explosion. A cover of "I Can't Wait", performed by Icona Pop and produced by Questlove, was used in a 2015 series of Target commercials.

Nu Shooz continued to record and perform through the 2010s, releasing their album Bagtown in 2016.

Discography

Studio albums

Singles

Other releases
 Nu Shooz: Then and Now DVD (NSO Music LLC, 2006)

See also
List of number-one dance hits (United States)
List of artists who reached number one on the US Dance chart
Music of Oregon

References

Other sources
 The Billboard Book of Top 40 Hits, 6th Edition - 1996 - BPI Communications -

External links
 Nu Shooz - Official website

Musical groups from Portland, Oregon
American pop music groups
American contemporary R&B musical groups
Musical groups established in 1979
American dance music groups
Atlantic Records artists
Family musical groups
1979 establishments in Oregon